Horoya Athletic Club, also known as Horoya Conakry or H.A.C., is a Guinean football club based in Conakry, Guinea. The club plays in the Ligue 1 Pro, the top tier in the Guinean football league system. It was founded in 1975.

History
In 2014, they eliminated the 2013 FIFA Club World Cup runner-up Raja Casablanca in the second qualifying round of the 2014 CAF Champions League.

In 2018, after finishing second in the group stage of the CAF Champions League, the club reached the quarter-finals for the first time in its history, where it lost against Al Ahly SC 4–0 on aggregate (0–0 in Conakry and 4–0 in Cairo).

Club identity 
The name Horoya means Liberty or Freedom in both Guinea's local and Arabic languages.
The word comes from the huge and significant Arabic influence on Guinean society.

Home shirt
Its Home shirt colours are red and white. The red, symbol of blood of the martyrs for the independence struggle and white for great purity and hope.

Crest

Honours

National
Ligue 1 Pro: 20
Champion: 1986, 1988, 1989, 1990, 1991, 1992, 1994, 2000, 2001, 2011, 2012, 2013, 2014, 2016, 2017, 2018, 2019, 2020, 2021, 2022 (Record)

Guinée Coupe Nationale: 9
Champion: 1989, 1994, 1995, 1999, 2013, 2014, 2016, 2018, 2019

Guinean Super Cup: 6
Champion: 2012, 2013, 2016, 2017, 2018, 2022  (Record)

International
African Cup Winners' Cup: 1
Champion: 1978

UFOA Cup: 1
Champion: 2009

Rivalry
The Conakry Derby, is a football match between Guinean clubs Horoya AC and Santoba FC. It is a match between arguably the two most successful clubs in Guinea.

Performance in CAF competitions
CAF Champions League : 12 appearances

2000 – First Round
2002 – Preliminary Round
2012 – First Round

2013 – Preliminary Round
2014 – Play-off Round
2016 – First Round

2017 – First Round
2018 – Quarter-finals
2018–19 – Quarter finals
2019–20 – First Round
2020–21 – Group Stage (Top 16) 
2021–22 –  Group Stage

 African Cup of Champions Clubs : 6 appearances

1986 – Second Round
1987 – First Round

1989 – First Round
1992 – Second Round

1993 – First Round
1995 – First Round

 CAF Confederation Cup : 2 appearances

2017 - Group Stage (Top 16) 
2019–2020 - Semi-finals CAF Cup : 3 appearances1997 – First Round
1998 – Second Round
1999 – First RoundCAF Cup Winners' Cup : 7 appearances1978 – Champion1979 – Semi-finals
1980 – Second Round

1983 – Semi-finals
1984 – First Round
1985 – Second Round

1996 – First RoundWest African Club Championship : 1 appearance2009 – Champion'Current squadAs of 12 November, 2021''

Notable coaches
 Mario Diabaté
 Pierre Bangoura
 Mohamed Dansoko
 Souleymane Cherif
 Mohamed Lamine Kaba
 Mory Conde La Valeur
 Kanfory Lapé Bangoura
 Mamadouba Sylla
 Aboubacar Fofana
 Mohamed Zouba Camara
 Amara Péle
 Mohamed Sylla Leandro
 Ibrahima Sory Toure Damas
 Issiaga Fadiga
 Théophile Bola 
 Amara Traore
 Kanfory Lapé Bangoura
 Victor Zvunka
 Patrice Neveu
 Didier Gomes Da Rosa

References

External links
 Horoya AC Official website
 Horoya AC Official Facebook Page

 
Football clubs in Guinea
Sport in Conakry
1975 establishments in Guinea
African Cup Winners Cup winning clubs